Events from the year 1706 in art.

Events
 Engraver Sébastien Leclerc is granted the title of cavaliere Romano by the Pope.

Works

 Jan Brokoff – Statue of St Joseph (on the Charles Bridge in Prague; later replaced)
 Giovanni Battista Parodi – The Miracle of the Chains of Peter (ceiling fresco in San Pietro in Vincoli, Rome)

Births
 January 3 – Johann Caspar Füssli, portrait painter (died 1782)
 January 17 – George Michael Moser, Swiss-born enameller (died 1783)
 February 12 – Johann Joseph Christian, German Baroque sculptor and woodcarver (died 1777)
 February 26 – Jan Antonín Vocásek, Czech Baroque still-life painter (died 1757)
 March 4 – Lauritz de Thurah, Danish architect (died 1759)
 March 12 – Johan Pasch, Swedish painter (died 1769)
 March 23 – Anna Maria Barbara Abesch, Swiss reverse glass painter (died 1773)
 April 1 – Christian Friedrich Boetius, German engraver (died 1782)
 April 30 – Philipp Jakob Straub, Austrian sculptor (died 1774)
 June 15 – Johann Joachim Kändler, German modeller of Meissen porcelain in a rococo style (died 1775)
 September 8 – Antoine de Favray, French portrait painter (died 1798)
 date unknown
 Sabina Auffenwerth, German potter (died 1782)
 Johan Backman, Finnish painter (died 1768)
 George Bickham the Younger, English etcher, engraver, printseller, and one of the first English caricaturists (died 1771)
 Simon François Ravenet, French engraver (died 1774)
 Pieter Tanjé, engraver from the Northern Netherlands (died 1761)
 Miguel Verdiguier, French sculptor (died 1796)

Deaths
 January 10 – Luisa Roldán, Spanish sculptor (born 1652)
 May 17 – Jean-Pierre Rivalz, French painter (born 1625)
 July 3 – Thomas Regnaudin, French sculptor (born 1622)
 August 10 – Lorenzo Vaccaro, Italian sculptor (born 1655)
 August 26 – Michael Willmann, German painter (born 1630)
 September 26 – Onofrio Gabrieli, Italian painter (born 1619)
 November 16 – Gottfried Schalken, Dutch painter (born 1643)
 date unknown
 Ambrogio Besozzi, Italian painter (born 1648)
 Ippolito Galantini, Italian painter and monk (born 1627)
 Luo Mu, Chinese painter, poet and prose writer (born 1622)
 Jacques Prou, French Academic sculptor (born 1655)
 Carlo Sacchi, Italian painter and engraver (born 1617)

 
Years of the 18th century in art
1700s in art